Əsrik Cırdaxan (also, Əsrik Çırdaxan, Asrikdzhirdakhan, Asrik-Dzhyrdakan, and Asrikdzhyrdakhan) is a village and municipality in the Tovuz Rayon of Azerbaijan.  It has a population of 2,154.

Notable natives 

 Mastan Aliyev — Hero of the Soviet Union.

References 

Populated places in Tovuz District